Ayıbeli ("bear gate" in Turkish) is a highland village of Espiye district of the Giresun Province of Turkey. It is also one of the springs of the Gelivera stream.

References 

Villages in Espiye District